Lastoursville or Mandji is a city in east-central Gabon, lying on the Ogooué River, the Trans-Gabon Railway and the N3 road.  It was founded as a slave depot named Mandji, renamed Maadiville in 1883 and finally took its current name for François Rigail de Lastours in 1886.  It grew around palm oil production and as an administrative centre, and soon became a major missionary centre.  The town is also known for its caves.

The town lies at an elevation of 206 m.

Caves
Occupying a 90-sq-km site, there are more than 40 caves identified, located in dense primary rainforest close to town. Traces of human activity dates back 7000 years, when the caves were used in rituals.

World Heritage Status 

The caves were added to the UNESCO World Heritage Tentative List on October 20, 2005 in the Mixed (Cultural + Natural) category.

Notes

References 
 Grottes de Lastourville - UNESCO World Heritage Centre Retrieved 2009-03-19.
 Lastoursville caves website www.grottes-de-lastoursville.org

Populated places in Ogooué-Lolo Province
Mouloundou Department